Clapham-Stern House, also known as Wenlo and originally known as Stone House, is a historic mansion located at Roslyn Harbor in Nassau County, New York. It was originally built between 1868 and 1872 and turned into a premier estate in 1906 after being purchased by department store magnate Benjamin Stern. It is an asymmetrical -story dwelling resting on a full basement. It consists of a main block with wings to the north and south, a tower, and a piazza wrapping around the south and west sides. It is constructed of rough-faced gray Greenwich granite accented by limestone. It has a moderately pitched hipped slate roof with copper cresting. After a major fire in 1960, the house was returned to a High Victorian Gothic style. Also on the property is a contributing bathhouse dated to the 1920s.

It was listed on the National Register of Historic Places in 2005.

References

External links

Houses on the National Register of Historic Places in New York (state)
Gothic Revival architecture in New York (state)
Houses completed in 1906
Houses in Nassau County, New York
National Register of Historic Places in North Hempstead (town), New York
1906 establishments in New York (state)